The Belgian railway line 125 is a railway line in Belgium connecting Liège and Namur. Completed in 1851, the line runs 59.5 km. It runs along the northern (left) bank of the river Meuse.

Stations
The main interchange stations on line 125 are:

Liège-Guillemins: to Brussels, Hasselt, Maastricht, Aachen, Marche-en-Famenne and Gouvy
Namur: to Brussels, Luxembourg City, Dinant and Charleroi

Accidents and incidents
On 3 July 2008, a passenger train was in a rear-end collision with a freight train at Huy, near Saint-Georges-sur-Meuse. Forty-two people were injured.
On 5 June 2016, a passenger train was in a rear-end collision with a freight train at Hermalle-sous-Huy. Three people were killed and 36 were wounded, nine seriously.

References

125
Railway lines opened in 1850
3000 V DC railway electrification